The Rennie Memorial Presbyterian Church is a Presbyterian Church (U.S.A) congregation. it was established on April 23, 1950, in Amelia, Virginia. The church sits on grounds that were previously occupied by the Amelia Presbyterian Church.

Rennie congregation

During the late 1880s, Mr. Thomas Major, father of Mr. S. T. Major, organized a Sunday School in a little school house about four miles southwest of Amelia Courthouse, Virginia.  For a short period of time the Rev. George Denny preached for this small group.

After about ten years, the Sunday School moved to the crossroads known as Dutch Store.  Here the group met in a very small room used by Mr. and Mrs. William Harver as a school room for their children.  Mr. S. T. Major was the superintendent during this period, and the moving force who kept the Sunday School going.  Regardless of the weather, bad roads, sickness, or other things which kept many members away, Mr. Major was always on hand to hold Sunday School even when only a few were present.  The Rev. J. R. Rennie began preaching for the congregation in the school house.

Building and land donation

On October 1, 1912, the Rev. D.P. Rogers became pastor of the Amelia group of churches.  After his arrival, the Amelia Presbyterian Church erected the building which they are now using.  In 1914, the Amelia Church offered to give the old building to the Rennie congregation.  A few days after the gift, the building was torn down and was swiftly erected again by the men of the Rennie community on its present site.  The current building was the old Grub Hill Episcopal Church before having been moved to the Amelia Church.  It dates from 1732, making it the oldest church building in the county.

The lot on which the church was erected and the land for the adjoining cemetery were donated by Mr. S. T. Major.  No greater tribute could be paid to the memory of Mr. Major than the organization of 80 charter members into a rapidly growing church with a full, well-rounded program.

On April 23, 1950, the congregation established itself as a separate and independent church becoming Rennie Memorial Presbyterian Church.  The ruling elders for this newly organized church were W. L. Reames, James Campbell, L. I. Major, and C. C. Bishop.  The  deacons were Woodrow Arrington, O. R. Tomlinson, Clyde Bishop, Lester Curtis, and James Lee Hall.  The Rev. Douglas Wilkinson was the minister at the time.  The church continued to grow and its need to expand became evident.  In the early 1960s, the church building grew to accommodate four Sunday School rooms, a basement Fellowship Hall, kitchen, and storage area.  Members were able to contribute to the building fund by use of the “Joash Chest,” into which the Sunday School also contributed with its collections from the first Sunday of each month.

Cluster system

By the late-1960s, a plan was proposed by the Presbytery for a cluster system to be formed among the Rennie Memorial, the Amelia, the Pine Grove, and the Mattoax churches.  These four churches called their first pastor to begin serving them in January, 1974.  During this time, ACTS (Amelia Cluster Teens) group became very active in the community.

In 1987, Amelia Presbyterian Church requested to withdraw from the cluster system.  The remaining three congregations arranged a system where one minister could serve them.  Rennie Memorial opted to have services early on Sunday mornings to accommodate such a necessity, while the Mattoax and the Pine Grove congregations worshiped together with the same minister.

In 1999, the cluster system ended, with the Mattoax and the Pine Grove congregations withdrawing from the Amelia Presbyterian Cluster.  They continued to worship together with their pastor, the Rev. Patrice Bittner-Humphreys.

Modern ministry

In the 2000s, Rennie Memorial has continued to serve God through education and Biblical learning—in the same way it began in the 1880s.  The congregation has shifted its approach in ministry from having full-time pastors to having student interns who stay for varying durations in order to learn ministry in a congregational setting.  Rennie Memorial is a church that is proud of its heritage and history, and it continues looking toward the future in service to God's kingdom.

References

Churches in Amelia County, Virginia